Georgia Ward (born 17 August 1995) is a British  diver.

Career
At the 2015 European Diving Championships, she competed in the Women's 10 m platform, in the Team event and won Silver in the 10 metre platform synchro with partner Robyn Birch.

At the 2016 European Aquatics Championships she won Silver in the Mixed 10 m platform synchro with partner Matty Lee. She also won two Bronze in the Women's 10 m platform and in the Team event with partner Matty Lee.

Diving achievements

References

British female divers
1995 births
Living people